New Liberalism may refer to:

New liberalism as a synonym for social liberalism
New Liberalism (Colombia), a party